Pascal Parisot (born November 1963), is a French songwriter and singer.

Discography

Rumba (2000)
 Ca alors   	  	  	03:49   	
 Qui m'aime ne me suive pas 	03:46 	
 Diplômé de toi 			03:41 	
 Qui s'ignore 			03:47 	
 Suzanne 				04:49 	
 Je t'aime 			03:27 	
 Inutile de me faire les yeux d... 04:23 	
 Ah ! Si j'avais du pognon 	03:46 	
 Je reste au lit			03:53 	
 Tralala pas toi			04:05 	
 Rumba				03:00

Wonderful (2003)
 Wonderful   	  	  	02:47   	
 Que je sache 			03:02 	
 Tout va bien 			03:54 	
 Je = toi 			03:35 	
 Victime de l'amour 		03:00 	
 Les gens sont méchants 	02:51 	
 Moi scorpion, toi balance 	03:29 	
 La salle de bain 		03:32 	
 Sombre héros 			03:11 	
 Je veux être extraordinaire 	03:47 	
 Les gondoles à Denise 	03:08 	
 Lapin ! 			02:34

Bêtes en stock (2010)
 Fantaisie animale 00:27 
 On est des betes 02:41
 Le cri de l'homme 02:29
 Requiem pour un pou 03:37
 J'mange de l'herbe 02:22
 La petite souris 02:46
 Ca sent le poney 02:36
 Pauvre homme de cro-magnon 02:11
 Tsé Tsé la mouche 03:05
 Ça commence par pi 02:04
 Like a spanish cow 02:47
 Caniche sauvage 01:55
 Pas de chat, pas de chien 03:31
 Ho hisse 02:21

External links 
 Official web site
 Biography

1963 births
Living people
French male singers
French songwriters
Male songwriters